Mikhail Youzhny was the defending champion, but lost in the first round to Janko Tipsarević.

None of the 8 seeded players reached quarter-finals. Michaël Llodra won his only ATP 500 singles final 6–7(3–7), 6–3, 7–6(7–4), against Robin Söderling.

Seeds

Draw

Finals

Top half

Bottom half

External links
 Main draw
 Qualifying draw

Singles